The Gibraltar Open was a ranking snooker tournament. In 2015 it was part of the Players Tour Championship. The tournament started in 2015 and was staged at the Europa Point Sports Complex in Gibraltar. Robert Milkins is the current champion.

Winners

References

 
International sports competitions hosted by Gibraltar
Snooker minor-ranking tournaments
Snooker ranking tournaments
Recurring sporting events established in 2015
2015 establishments in Gibraltar
Players Tour Championship